The NWA North American Tag Team Championship is an inactive professional wrestling tag team championship that was used and defended in various territories throughout the National Wrestling Alliance., prior to its being purchased in 2017 by Billy Corgan. This is the fifth NWA sanctioned championship to bear this name. Unlike its predecessors, each of which was only used in a specific territory, this title is defended in NWA territories throughout the world in much the same way as the NWA World Tag Team Championship. Also, as with the NWA World Tag Team Championship, the title is ultimately controlled by the NWA Board of Directors and title changes occur only when a majority of the board votes to do so. Originally, the championship was called the MCW North American Tag Team Championship and was defended in Music City Wrestling based out of Nashville, Tennessee.

Title History

See also
List of National Wrestling Alliance championships
NWA North American Tag Team Championship (Central States version)

References

External links
 NWA North American Tag Team Titles

National Wrestling Alliance championships
Tag team wrestling championships